Sminthurinus elegans is a species of springtails in the family Katiannidae. It is found in Europe.

References

  at fauna-eu.org

Collembola
Animals described in 1863